The 2006 National Women Football Championship was the second season of the National Women Football Championship, the top-tier of women's football in Pakistan. The tournament took place from 19 to 28 August 2006 at Jinnah Sports Stadium in Islamabad.

WAPDA won their maiden title by beating Islamabad 1-0 in the final. Mejzgaan Orakzai of Islamabad won the Best Player award.

Teams 
Twelve teams competed in the tournament.
 Azad Jammu & Kashmir
 Balochistan
 Balochistan Red
 Diya
 Islamabad
 Karachi Kickers
 Pakistan Police
 Punjab
 Punjab University
 Sindh Green
 Sindh Red
 WAPDA

References 

National Women Football Championship seasons